On 19 October 2006, the Royal Institution of Great Britain named the 1975 short story collection The Periodic Table, by Primo Levi, the best science book ever.  After taking nominations from many scientists in various disciplines, authors, and other notable people (such as the Archbishop of Canterbury), the Royal Institution compiled a shortlist of books for consideration.  This shortlist was presented to the public at an event held at Imperial College and the audience voted to determine which book was "the best."

List of books

Shortlist
 The Periodic Table (1975) by Primo Levi (winner)
 King Solomon's Ring (1949) by Konrad Lorenz
 Arcadia (1993) by Tom Stoppard
 The Selfish Gene (1976) by Richard Dawkins

Other nominees
 The Double Helix by James Watson
 The Life of Galileo by Bertolt Brecht
 Pluto's Republic by Peter Medawar
 The Voyage of the Beagle by Charles Darwin
 The Blank Slate by Steven Pinker
 A Leg to Stand On by Oliver Sacks
 Consciousness Explained by Daniel Dennett
 Shadows of the Mind by Roger Penrose
 On Growth and Form by D'Arcy Wentworth Thompson
 Invention by Norbert Wiener
 Gödel, Escher, Bach by Douglas Hofstadter
 Mathematics, Form and Function by Saunders Mac Lane
 A Mathematician's Apology by G.H. Hardy
 The Man Who Mistook His Wife for a Hat by Oliver Sacks
 How to Build a Time Machine by Paul Davies
 Mason & Dixon by Thomas Pynchon
 Surely You're Joking, Mr. Feynman! by Richard Feynman
 The Strategy of Conflict by Thomas Schelling
 The Microbe Hunters by Paul de Kruif

References

External links
 

British literary awards
Awards established in 2006
Awards disestablished in 2006
Science writing awards
Top book lists